Caribair was an  airline based in Santo Domingo, Dominican Republic. It operated scheduled services within the Dominican Republic and to Haiti, as well as charter flights and air taxi services throughout the Caribbean. Its main base was La Isabela International Airport, Santo Domingo.

History 

The airline was established and began operations in 1983. It began operations with two aircraft and changed ownership in 1988.

On January 20, 2009 the Dominican Civil Aviation Institute (IDAC) ordered Caribair to suspend its flight operations due to alleged "operational irregularities". Caribair reportedly was found by IDAC inspectors to be "masking multiple commercial operations as private operations in unauthorized airplanes."  The company announced on January 26, 2009 that it would appeal the suspension. IDAC later allowed the airline to recommence operations, with a reduced schedule using only two aircraft.

Destinations 

Caribair operated services to the following international scheduled destinations (at January 2005): Port-au-Prince and Santiago de Cuba.

Caribair flew to 26 destinations in 9 countries, including Aruba, the Bahamas, Haiti, Netherlands Antilles, Jamaica, Puerto Rico, Trinidad and Tobago, Cuba, and some scheduled charter flights to the United States.

Domestics destinations included all airports in Dominican Republic, making it the largest airline of the country.

Fleet
In March 2007 the Caribair fleet included the following aircraft:

Codeshare agreements 

Caribair was the parent company of the Haitian airline Caribintair. Caribair had 6 aircraft in leasing for this airline, operating domestics flights in Haiti, as well as some international flights to Santo Domingo and Santiago, Dominican Republic. They also operated charter flights into Barahona and Dajabon.
All Caribintair flights were codeshared by Caribair.

References

External links 

 Caribair
 Caribair 

Defunct airlines of the Dominican Republic
Airlines established in 1983
Airlines disestablished in 2009
1983 establishments in the Dominican Republic
2009 disestablishments in the Dominican Republic